Pupa affinis is a species of small sea snail, a marine gastropod mollusc in the family Acteonidae.  It is found in the waters around the North Island of New Zealand.

Description

The shell is 15 mm in length and is usually white, beige, or brown, with or without black markings. It is egg shaped (ovate) with an elevated spire. The columella or central axis of the shell has a large double fold.

Synonyms
 Pupa nivea Angas, 1871 : synonym of Pupa affinis (A. Adams, 1855)
 Distribution : West Australia
 Length : 14 mm
 Description : slender, elongate shell with sharp apex; white colored with numerous fine spiral grooves.
 Pupa strigosa Gould, 1859
 Distribution : Indo-West Pacific, Japan, Taiwan, South China Sea
 Length : 13 mm
 Description : intertidal to 100 m in sand; white-colored with many black spiral grooves.
 Pupa strigosa sekii Habe, 1958
 Distribution : Japan
A synonym of this species, described for science by Frederick Hutton, may have been named for New Zealand cephalopod biologist Thomas William Kirk, or his father Thomas Kirk, curator of the Auckland Museum.

References

 Dautzenberg, Ph. (1929). Contribution à l'étude de la faune de Madagascar: Mollusca marina testacea. Faune des colonies françaises, III(fasc. 4). Société d'Editions géographiques, maritimes et coloniales: Paris. 321–636, plates IV-VII pp.
 Beu A.G. (2004) Marine Mollusca of oxygen isotope stages of the last 2 million years in New Zealand. Part 1: Revised generic positions and recognition of warm-water and cool-water migrants. Journal of the Royal Society of New Zealand 34(2): 111–265. page(s): 218
 Burn R. (2006) A checklist and bibliography of the Opisthobranchia (Mollusca: Gastropoda) of Victoria and the Bass Strait area, south-eastern Australia. Museum Victoria Science Reports 10:1–42.
 Spencer H.G., Willan R.C., Marshall B.A. & Murray T.J. (2011) Checklist of the Recent Mollusca Recorded from the New Zealand Exclusive Economic Zone.

Acteonidae
Gastropods of New Zealand
Gastropods described in 1855